The Heinkel Lerche was the name of a set of project studies made by German aircraft designer Heinkel in 1944 and 1945 for a revolutionary VTOL fighter and ground-attack aircraft.

The Lerche was an early coleopter design. It would take off and land sitting on its tail, flying horizontally like a conventional aircraft. The pilot would lie prone in the nose. Most remarkably, it would be powered by two contra-rotating propellers which were contained in a doughnut-shaped, nine-sided annular wing.

The remarkably futuristic design was developed starting 1944 and concluding in March 1945. The aerodynamic principles of an annular wing were basically sound, but the proposal was faced with a whole host of unsolved manufacture and control problems which would have made the project highly impractical, even without the material shortages of late-war Nazi Germany.

Specifications (Lerche II)
Figures below are given for the 'Lerche II' plan dated 25 Feb 1945.

See also

References

 Luftwaffe Secret Projects - Ground Attack & Special Purpose Aircraft, D. Herwig & H. Rode, 

Annular-wing aircraft
Abandoned military aircraft projects of Germany
Ducted fan-powered aircraft
Lerche
1940s German fighter aircraft
Tailsitter aircraft